Mary Young is an American politician, psychologist, and special education teacher from the state of Colorado. A Democrat, Young has represented the 50th district of the Colorado House of Representatives, based in Greeley, since 2019.

Career
From 1973 until 2001, Young worked as a special education teacher, initially in Romeoville, Illinois before moving to Weld County, Colorado. After getting a Ph.D. in psychology in 2000, Young began working as a school psychologist, which she continues to do.

Political career 
In 2018, 50th district incumbent – and Young's husband – Dave Young ran successfully for Colorado State Treasurer, and was succeeded in the State House by fellow Democrat Rochelle Galindo. Galindo resigned only 5 months into her term, however, after being accused of sexual misconduct and providing alcohol to a minor.

That June, a Weld County Democratic vacancy committee met to determine Galindo's successor. Young won 6 of the committee's 9 votes, while Greeley-Evans school board member Rhonda Solis received 3; four other candidates applied but received no votes. Young assumed office immediately. She was re-elected in 2020 and 2022.

Tenure 
In the 2021-2022 legislative sessions, Young sat in the Public & Behavioral Health & Human Services Committee and was vice-chair of the Education Committee. In the 2022 legislative session, Young sponsored bills which aimed at improving supportive learning, special education, mental health, reducing license fees and other similar measures. In September 2022, the Colorado Behavioral Health Council recognized Young for her legislative work on behavioral health.

Personal life
Young lives in Greeley with her husband Dave. She is a school psychologist.

References

Living people
Democratic Party members of the Colorado House of Representatives
21st-century American politicians
Women state legislators in Colorado
21st-century American women politicians
Year of birth missing (living people)